Al-Barakah is a Syrian administrative district of the Islamic State (IS), a Salafi jihadist militant group and unrecognised proto-state. Originally set up as al-Barakah Province to govern ISIL territories in al-Hasakah Governorate, the province shifted south after 2016 due to the territorial losses to the YPG/YPJ. Having been demoted from province to district in 2018, al-Barakah administered a small strip of land along the Euphrates in Deir ez-Zor Governorate until the Battle of Baghuz Fawqani, since then the "territory" has turned into an insurgency.

History 

After entering the Syrian Civil War in 2013, the Islamic State of Iraq and the Levant started to call al-Hasakah Governorate "al-Barakah" (translated "the blessing" or "the blessed"). Having captured vast swaths of Iraq and Syria, ISIL reorganized itself as proto-state in 2013/14, creating a government and 18 provinces ("wilayah") under the authority of the "Provincial Council" to administer its territories. Al-Barakah Province was founded in early 2014 to govern ISIL-held areas in al-Hasakah Governorate, and essentially claimed the same boundaries as the latter. In a number of battles in course of 2014, most notably the Battle of Markada, ISIL defeated other rebel factions in the governorate and integrated their territories into al-Barakah Province. The province was further expanded during the 2014 Eastern Syria offensive. Nevertheless, the province's actual control remained limited to al-Hasakah Governorate's west and south, while the rest was held by YPG/YPJ and the Syrian Army.

After already losing much of its territory in 2015 to a number of YPG-led offensives, al-Barakah was reduced to al-Hasakah Governorate's frontier areas during the al-Shaddadi offensive of early 2016. Much of al-Barakah's regional leadership was also killed by an American airstrike in the latter offensive. By late 2017, al-Barakah consisted just of a few villages and oil wells in al-Hasakah Governorate's east; in response, the ISIL central command transferred some areas which previously belonged to "al-Furat [Euphrates] Province" to al-Barakah. Around November of that year, the leadership of al-Barakah Province agreed to a month-long ceasefire with the YPG-led Syrian Democratic Forces. On 19 April 2018, much of al-Barakah's leadership, including its governor, general Sharia official, and 30 battalion and sector commanders, were killed by a bombing during a meeting.

ISIL reorganized its regional affiliates in Iraq and Syria in July 2018, reducing former provinces like al-Barakah to districts and instead referring to all of Syria as a single province. After the launch of a SDF campaign to evict ISIL from its last Syrian strongholds east of the Euphrates in September 2018, ISIL further reorganized its territorial divisions. This move was probably due to ISIL losing all remaining territory in al-Hasakah Governorate during the early stages of the campaign. At the same time, a new "al-Hasakah" branch was set up in the areas which had originally been part of al-Barakah Province, probably to coordinate terrorist attacks there.

The territory of al-Barakah district came under increasing pressure during 2018, as the SDF advanced along the Euphrates. By late 2018, al-Barakah's territory witnessed heavy fighting, and al-Baghuz Fawqani, a village under al-Barakah's jurisdiction, became ISIL's last important territorial holding in Syria by February 2019. As the SDF and ISIL battled for Baghuz Fawqani, al-Barakah's media channel released a video declaring that defeat in this battle would not mean defeat in the entire campaign, and urged the ISIL loyalists to continue their resistance. Even as their last pocket in al-Baghuz was reduced to a small tent city and a cave system, ISIL continued to keep its institutions functioning, including its bureaucracy, police, and distribution of food and monetary aid to civilian followers.

Even though al-Barakah ceased to exist as coherent territorial entity following the Battle of Baghuz Fawqani, its forces remained active. Militants affiliated with al-Barakah pledged allegiance to ISIL's new caliph Abu Ibrahim al-Hashimi al-Qurashi on 9 November 2019, and reportedly attacked a U.S. base in al-Shaddadah on 26 December.

Organization

Territory 

Al-Barakah Province generally claimed all of al-Hasakah Governorate as its territory, though it never fully controlled the region. By early 2016, al-Barakah Province's headquarters was al-Shaddadah, while the province had been reduced to southern al-Hasakah Governorate. Following its demotion to district and move south, the administrative division covered Hajin and the villages of al-Baghuz Fawqani, al-Sayyal and Hasrat (which ISIL calls al-Khayrat) and Mawzan near the Euphrates, all of them part of the Abu Kamal District. Furthermore, the village of al-Bahra near Hajin was already part of al-Barakah since late 2017. Al-Barakah district in its current form is bordered by al-Furat district to its west and al-Khayr district to its northwest.

Leadership 

The province's first known governor ("wali") was Abdul Nasser Qardash in 2014. In June of that year, after ISIL's declaration of its caliphate, Qardash was transferred to other positions. He was succeeded by Abu Osama al-Iraqi who held the position from 2014 to 2015, when he was killed during the Battle of al-Hasakah city by an American airstrike. He had been a member of ISIL's senior leadership, and was considered to be one of the group's "military elite leaders". At some point in 2015, Qardash once gain became involved in governing al-Barakah. Later on, Abu al-Waleed al-Sinawi was appointed wali of al-Barakah. He was killed on 19 April 2018.

Another prominent member of al-Barakah's government was the Saudi female jihadist Rima al-Jarish, a co-founder of the al-Khansaa Brigade who "led the media machine" of al-Barakah from 2014 until her death in 2016 and was responsible for recruiting foreigners. Adam al-Chechani (d. 2016) served as leading military commander in the province by 2016. Two known general Sharia officials for al-Barakah include Sheikh Abu Raghad al-Da'jani, and Abu Raghad al-Da'jani (died 19 April 2018).

Furthermore, several sub-commanders and regional leaders of al-Barakah are known:
Abu Abeer al-Iraqi, "deputy emir" of al-Shaddadah until his death in 2016
Abu Aicha al-Jazrawi, head of the Sharia Court in al-Shaddadah from an unknown point after May 2015 until his death in 2016
 Abu Hamid, emir for tribal affairs and head of the Sharia Court until his death in 2015
Awn al-Murad al-Tunisi ("Abu Sayyaf al-Tunisi"), head of the Diwan al-Rikaz (ministry for the production/acquisition and sale of oil, gas, and antiquities) in al-Barakah and al-Khayr Provinces until his death in a U.S. Delta Force operation in May 2016
Faysal Ahmad Ali al-Zahrani, ISIL's oil and gas division official for al-Barakah from September 2014. He still held this position by December 2015, and had by then also assumed responsibility for a VBIED production site at al-Shaddadah.
Abu Jihad al-Tunisi, media official for al-Barakah

Politics and governance 

In governing al-Barakah, ISIL attempted to coopt local Arab tribes and clans. In doing so, it exploited lingering anti-Kurdish sentiment among al-Hasakah Governorate's Arab population. ISIL had originally "downplay[ed] accusations of anti-Kurdish racism" and presented itself as pan-Sunni organization which regarded ethnicity as unimportant. Consequently, a significant number of Kurds actually joined ISIL in al-Hasakah Governorate. Over time, however, ISIL's relations with the Kurdish population of Syria in general worsened due to the successes of the mostly Kurdish YPG/YPJ. As many Arabs feared Kurdish expansionism, ISIL thus started to present itself as defender of the Arab population and employed anti-Kurdish rhetoric. This tactic had some success, even convincing former Arab critics of ISIL that the jihadists' rule over al-Hasakah Governorate was preferable to the YPG/YPJ. Militant anti-Kurdish members of the Arab Tayy and Jibur tribes sided with ISIL in order to defend al-Barakah Province from the YPG-led Eastern al-Hasakah offensive of 2015.

ISIL's governance of al-Barakah occasionally suffered from some internal turmoil: At some point in or after 2016, some local ISIL judges went on strike to protest the impunity with which ISIL security officials ("amnis") were allowed to act in al-Barakah. By this point, civilians had also voiced opposition to the security agents' behavior. Regardless, higher-ranking ISIL officials ignored the issue.

In early 2014, ISIL was preparing to set up a "dhimmi pact" to deal with Christians living in al-Barakah Province, and ordered them to pay the jizya (a special tax for non-Muslims). At the time, the Jihadists were not yet officially forcing them to convert to Islam. Nevertheless, ISIL militants under al-Barakah's jurisdiction were known to abduct, ransom, persecute, and execute local Christians, sometimes disparagingly referred to as "crusaders" by ISIL followers. This ran contrary to the group's own portrayal of its policies, as al-Barakah's authorities claimed that they  acted mercifully toward Christians while also proselytizing them. Most notably, al-Barakah's media center released a report in March 2015 according to which several Christians from Tell Tamer had voluntarily converted and "received the caliphate's blessing". A local journalist argued, however, that the converts had probably been threatened with torture or death. Accordingly, ISIL's version of the story was propaganda "to attract the sympathy of Muslims worldwide".

Media and propaganda 
Al-Barakah has its own media channel, simply called "Al-Barakah Province" or "Al-Sham-Al-Barakah Province". The material released by this channel is often disseminated by the Amaq News Agency and the Shumukh Agency. By 2015, al-Barakah was among the ISIL provinces with the highest propaganda output. In its propaganda, ISIL did not just present al-Barakah Province's governance as ideal and fair, but also promoted the beauty of its natural environment. The media output of the province was initially reduced along with its shrinking territory during 2017, but as the Euphrates holdings of ISIL came into focus as the Jihadist organization's last important territory in Syria, al-Barakah regained some prominence. By 2018, the main focus of al-Barakah's media channel was ISIL's resistance against the advancing SDF.

Military 

Al-Barakah was part of the "Eastern Syria Command" of the military of ISIL by 2015. Like all ISIL provinces, al-Barakah was assigned money by the Islamic State's treasury department and Delegated Committee each month based on what was available and where support was most needed. Abdul Nasser Qardash stated that his budget for al-Barakah was $200 million in 2015. This money was spent on paying salaries of ISIL fighters, recruiting new troops, buying weaponry and ammunition, weapon development, and organizing military campaigns.

The number of ISIL fighters who served in the province varied over time. By mid-2014, the "Army of Hasakah" counted around 6,000 men; one its top commanders at the time was Abu Jandal al-Kuwaiti. In contrast, ISIL was only able to gather 4,500 troops for one of its last major offensives to expand al-Barakah in August 2015. Al-Barakah's regional military was known to include a unit of Southeast Asian child soldiers, called the "Putera Khilafa" (Princes of the Caliphate). ISIL also used multiple armoured fighting vehicles at the frontlines of al-Hasakah Governorate.

Notes

References

Citations

Works cited 

 

 
 
 
 
 
 

Islamic State of Iraq and the Levant
Al-Hasakah Governorate
Deir ez-Zor Governorate